Stephen John Toole (April 9, 1859 – March 20, 1919) was a 19th-century Major League Baseball player.

Biography
Steve Toole was born in New Orleans on April 9, 1859. He pitched from 1886 to 1890 in the American Association.

He was elected a commissioner of Allegheny County in November 1908, after campaigning by visiting voters on foot.

He died in Pittsburgh on March 20, 1919.

References

External links

Baseball Almanac
Involved in Triple Play

1859 births
1919 deaths
Major League Baseball pitchers
19th-century baseball players
Kansas City Cowboys players
Brooklyn Grays players
Brooklyn Gladiators players
Baseball players from Louisiana
Rochester Flour Cities players
Rochester Jingoes players
Buffalo Bisons (minor league) players
Burials at Calvary Catholic Cemetery (Pittsburgh)